Sardar Muhammad Irfan Dogar (born 25 December 1973) is a Pakistani politician who has been a member of the National Assembly of Pakistan, since August 2018. Previously he was a member of the National Assembly  from 2008 to May 2018.

Early life
He was born on 25 December 1973.

Political career
He ran for the seat of the National Assembly of Pakistan as a candidate of Pakistan Muslim League (N) (PML-N) from Constituency NA-134 (Sheikhupura-IV) in 2002 Pakistani general election but was unsuccessful. He received 32,113 votes and lost the seat to Khurram Munawar Manj, a candidate of Pakistan Peoples Party (PPP).

He was elected to the National Assembly as a candidate of PML-N from Constituency NA-134 (Sheikhupura-Cum-Nankana Sahib-II) in 2008 Pakistani general election. He received 47,925 votes and defeated Khurram Munawar Manj, a candidate of Pakistan Muslim League (Q) (PML-Q).

He was re-elected to the National Assembly as a candidate of PML-N from Constituency NA-134 (Sheikhupura-IV) in 2013 Pakistani general election. He received 44,397 votes and defeated an independent candidate, Khan Sher Akbar Khan.

He was re-elected to the National Assembly as a candidate of PML-N from Constituency NA-122 (Sheikhupura-IV) in 2018 Pakistani general election.

References

Living people
Pakistan Muslim League (N) politicians
Punjabi people
Pakistani MNAs 2013–2018
1973 births
Pakistani MNAs 2008–2013
Pakistani MNAs 2018–2023